Poltys columnaris, known as the tree stump spider, is a species of spider of the genus Poltys. It is found in India, Sri Lanka, Sumatra, and Japan.

Description

The spider has unusual column-shaped abdomen with shiny spots called maculae at base. It is mainly a nocturnal hunter, remaining motionless during the day. The male is very much smaller in size at 1.5-2.1 mm; the female is larger at 7.8-15.1 mm.

See also 
 List of Araneidae species

References

External links
photos

Spiders of Asia
Araneidae
Spiders described in 1890